Mojtaba Maleki  (Persian:  مجتبی ملکی) (born 1983) is an Iranian Strongman and Powerlifter, competing for Iran in international strongman and powerlifting competitions.

He participated six times in Iran's Strongest Man competition, placing runner-up in three (2001, 2004–2005).
He reached the world record of raw squat with knee wraps, 500 kg, on 21 September 2017.

See also
Iran's Strongest Man
World Powerlifting Congress
World Strongman Cup Federation

References

External links
ادعای مردان آهنین: داداشی با لابی خودنگاه قهرمان شد
Asian Powerlifting Championships 2006
Asian Powerlifting Championships 2004

1983 births
Living people
Iranian powerlifters
Iranian strength athletes